At Night (original title: Om natten) is a 2007 Danish short film. It was nominated for Best Live Action Short Film at the 2008 Oscars.

Plot
Three young women between the ages of 18 and 20 have been diagnosed with cancer. In the days between Christmas and New Year, the three girls manage to deal positively with the situation thanks to the company of each other.

Cast
 Julie Ølgaard as Stephanie
 Laura Christensen as Sara
 Neel Rønholt as Mette
 Henrik Prip as Torben

Awards and nominations
Academy Awards
2008: Nominated, "Best Short Film, Live Action"

External links
 
 
 At Night at DFI.dk

2007 films
2000s Danish-language films
Danish drama films
Danish short films
Zentropa films
Films directed by Christian E. Christiansen
Films produced by Louise Vesth